E. K. Krishnan Ezhuthachan (4 January 1924 – 13 December 2005) was a legal expert and writer a native of Chettupuzha, Thrissur, Kerala. Ezhuthachan had served as Magistrate, Deputy secretary at Ministry of Law and Justice (India), Lawyer in the Supreme Court of India etc. He has authored several books. His book Bharanaghatanakku Oru Bhashyam won the Puthezhan Award.

Works
 Puraathanakila
 Thankamudhra
 Judge(Novel)
 Nadhikal Kadha parayunnu
 Amme oru Kadha parayu
 Pramaadamaaya kolakkesukal
 Bharanaghatanakku oru bhaashyam
 Ramayanam muthal god of small things vare: viswasaahityathile 100 kruthikalude avalokanam
 Law of dictionary: English-Malayalam with case law
 Niyama vijnaanakosam
 Bharanaghatana kuttikalkku 
 Shaakya simham
 Kuroor

References

1924 births
2005 deaths
Indian legal writers
Malayali people
Malayalam-language writers
People from Thrissur district
Writers from Kerala
Indian political writers